The Fujifilm X-Trans is a sensor developed by Fujifilm and used in its Fujifilm X series cameras. Unlike most sensors featuring a conventional Bayer filter array, X-Trans sensors have a unique 6 by 6 pattern of photosites. Fujifilm claims that this layout can minimise moiré effects, and in turn increase resolution by eliminating the need for a low-pass filter.

Details
Typical Bayer sensor arrays have RGB photosites in a repeated 2 by 2 pattern. When it overlaps with a regular pattern that is being captured, a new interference pattern can occur that does not exist in real life. In contrast, X-Trans sensors have a more randomised pattern of RGB photosites than conventional Bayer array sensors, reducing the likelihood of interference and removing a need for a low-pass filter that lowers image resolution. See U.S. Patent 8,531,563.

Conventional Bayer sensors can also produce false colour as they do not have R and B photosites in some horizontal and vertical lines, Fujifilm claims that X-Trans sensors on the other hand have an improved colour reproduction due to all horizontal and vertical lines containing at least one R, G and B pixels.

Fuji claims that APS-C sized X-Trans sensors, while being physically smaller, have a greater perceived resolution than the number of pixels on the sensor and are said to be on par with some full frame sensors.

X-Trans sensors are said to be manufactured for Fujifilm by Sony Corporation.

While the first three generations of X-Trans sensors are front-illuminated, the fourth generation uses the principle of backside illumination. This improves noise levels and image quality.

Drawbacks

Image artifacts 
Under certain conditions, cameras equipped with X-Trans II and III sensors can exhibit purple flare/grid artifacts in backlit photos. This occurs due to the particular arrangement of the phase detection and masking layers on the sensor. The appearance of the effect can vary with the demosaicing algorithms in use.

Future development
In an interview with DPreview during the CP+ 2017 show in Yokohama, Japan Fujifilm confirmed that an X-Trans sensor array is to be used for its next generation of APS-C sized sensors, whilst larger medium format sensors will continue using a conventional Bayer array because of the increased processing requirements of X-Trans filter arrangement.

List of X-Trans sensors

References

Fujifilm
Digital photography
Color filter array